Lin Tin Kyaw (born 1996) is a Burmese swimmer. He competed in the 50 m and 100 m breaststroke  events at the 2013 World Aquatics Championships.

References

Living people
1996 births
Burmese male swimmers
Male breaststroke swimmers